The 1971 Pacific hurricane season began on May 15, 1971, in the east Pacific, and on June 1, 1971, in the central Pacific. It ended on November 30, 1971. These dates conventionally delimit the period of time when tropical cyclones form in the east Pacific Ocean.

The 1971 season was above average with 18 named storms. Twelve hurricanes formed, of which six became major hurricanes by reaching Category 3 or higher on the Saffir-Simpson Hurricane Scale. At the time, this was a record number of storms. This season had six landfalls (Agatha, Bridget, Katrina, Lily, Olivia and Priscilla), the highest number of landfalling Pacific tropical cyclones in one season.



Systems

Hurricane Agatha 

On May 21, an area of low pressure developed in the very warm waters south of Tehuantepec, Mexico. Later that day, satellite images showed increasing circulation and Tropical Storm Agatha developed shortly after. Agatha continued moving to the west-northwest parallel to the Mexican coastline and strengthened into a hurricane on May 22. A U.S. Air Force weather reconnaissance aircraft flew into Agatha and found an eye and strong bands. Agatha made landfall as a Category 2 hurricane on the Saffir-Simpson hurricane scale within  of Zihuatanejo, Mexico.

The village of Playa Azul was hard hit by the storm. Up to half of the village's homes were destroyed, and much of the banana, mango, and coconut crops were destroyed.

Hurricane Bridget 

A tropical disturbance near El Salvador remained unorganized until June 12. The area of convection started to drift west-northwestward and strengthened into Tropical Depression Two-E. On June 15, the Tropical Depression further intensified into Tropical storm status and was named Bridget, the second tropical storm of the season. Tropical Storm Bridget moved across the Gulf of Tehuantepec which was favorable for Development. On June 16, Bridget continued intensifying and satellite imagery and ship report data confirmed that Bridget had strengthened into a hurricane. Hurricane Bridget continued moving west-northwest along the west coast of Mexico and came within  of Acapulco on June 17. However, the Tropical Depression Re-entered open waters and dissipated on June 20.

Bridget was the worst hurricane to hit Acapulco in over 25 years; the last strong hurricane to impact Acapulco to a greater extent was the 1943 Mazatlan Hurricane, which made landfall as a Category 3 hurricane and caused $56 million (1971 USD; $  USD) in damage. Hurricane Bridget's storm surge caused flooding in the bay and damaged waterfront and beach facilities. Rough weather and violent seas also sank 20 boats plus a flagship of the Mexican Navy.

Hurricane Carlotta 

On July 2 the area of thunderstorms strengthened into Tropical Storm Carlotta. An Air Force reconnaissance aircraft flew into Carlotta on July 4 and found a system with a well-defined eye and good outflow, but winds only supported a tropical storm. Another reconnaissance plane found winds that were near hurricane strength on July 4. In post-season analysis, it was discovered that Carlotta was a hurricane for 24 hours on July 3 and 4. Later that day, Carlotta started weakening after moving into a less favorable environment. The storm continued to weaken until dissipating on July 8.

Carlotta stayed over open waters during its entire life and no land was affected.

Hurricane Denise 

On July 4 satellite imagery indicated that the system had strengthened into Tropical Storm Denise and later into Hurricane Denise on July 6. The system continued to move west and on July 7, U.S. Air Force weather reconnaissance plane found a more organized system with sustained winds estimated to be  with a minimum central pressure of 963 mbar (hPa; 28.4 inHg).

Denise had started a northwest movement towards Hawaii. A reconnaissance aircraft found surface winds of approximately 115 mph (185 mph) on July 9. Soon after, the eyewall started to dissipate, most likely because of cooler inflow. Over the next 48 hours, the system continued to weaken into a tropical storm. On July 13 the system was approaching the Hawaiian Islands, but a reconnaissance flight only found winds that were barely tropical storm strength. What was left of the storm quickly weakened and Denise became a remnant low.

The remnants of Denise moved south of the Hawaiian Islands, but still brought beneficial rains that caused some minor flooding.

Tropical Storm Eleanor 

Eleanor was a short-lived, weak tropical storm that stayed well out to sea. On July 7, a tropical depression formed east-southeast of the weakening Carlotta and west of the strengthening Denise. By July 8, satellite imagery showed that the depression had strengthened into a tropical storm. On July 10, a U.S. Air Force weather reconnaissance plane found a weakening system and the next day the storm was a dissipating depression moving toward the west-southwest.

Hurricane Francene 

An area of enhanced shower activity and low pressure circulation developed a couple hundred miles off the coast of Mexico. On July 18 a tropical depression had formed and on July 19 the system strengthened into Tropical Storm Francene. Francene underwent rapid deepening into a Category 3 hurricane on the Saffir-Simpson Hurricane Scale. However, because of Francene's increasing size, the storm starting pulling in cool surface air which caused weakening. By July 20, Francene had weakened into a tropical storm. Francene continued to weaken over the next 24 hours and was barely a tropical storm by the morning of July 22. That afternoon, Francene began to strengthen once again but it was short-lived. By July 23, the surface circulation had disappeared and Francene was no longer a tropical cyclone. Francene stayed over open water and did not affect land.

Tropical Storm Georgette 

A tropical depression formed to the east of Hurricane Francene on July 20. Georgette reached a peak intensity of  the next day. Ships to the north of Georgette reported weak tropical storm force winds. By July 26 the storm began to weaken rapidly before dissipating the next day.

Hurricane Hilary 

Hilary weakened slightly as its motion became erratic across the tropical Pacific Ocean. By August 1 the hurricane turned to the northwest towards cooler waters. Hilary weakened into a tropical storm on August 3 after being at hurricane strength for a week. Steady weakening continued over the next four days before dissipating in the Central Pacific.

Hurricane Ilsa 

Hurricane Ilsa formed on July 31 to the south of the Mexican coast. It gradually strengthened into a tropical storm and a hurricane. Ilsa peaked as a Category 3 hurricane before heading further out to sea and weakening. Hurricane Ilsa dissipated on August 8.

Tropical Storm Jewel 

Tropical Storm Jewel formed near Mexico on August 6. Heading out to sea, it strengthened into a  tropical storm. It dissipated on August 11.

Tropical Storm Katrina 

Katrina was a very small storm. Katrina brushed Baja California Sur and made landfall in the Mexican state of Sonora as a tropical storm. It dissipated on August 13. Rain from Katrina's remnants ruined crops, destroyed railroad trestles, and washed away three bridges.

Hurricane Lily 

The remnants of Tropical Storm Chloe in the Atlantic formed into Tropical Depression Twelve on August 28. Twelve continued northeast and intensified into a tropical storm and was thus assigned the name Lily. Lily turned northwest. Rapid intensification occurred and Lily developed an eye. Lily peaked with one-minute sustained winds of 85 mph and a pressure of 978mb. Lily made landfall soon after. Once over land, Lily fell below tropical storm intensity. Then the hurricane turned northwest and dissipated soon after.

Hurricane Monica 

Monica was a Category 3 hurricane which did not affect land.

Hurricane Nanette 

Hurricane Nanette threatened southern Baja California but turned west before making landfall.

Hurricane Olivia 

Olivia was a continuation of Atlantic Hurricane Irene. Olivia eventually strengthened into a Category 3 hurricane before recurving and making landfall in Baja California as a depression. The remnants of Olivia continued north into California, where they brought rain.

Hurricane Priscilla 

Priscilla made landfall south of Mazatlán as a tropical storm. It had weakened significantly before landfall, having once been a strong Category 3 hurricane. Priscilla destroyed roughly 36,000 acres of corn, tomatoes, peppers, bananas, and cotton, resulting in $3.12 million in losses. Heavy rains inundated 30 towns in Nayarit, damaging roads and two major thoroughfares; road damage totaled $544,000.

Tropical Storm Ramona 

Ramona formed on October 28, it quickly strengthened into a tropical storm. It later weakened back to a tropical depression. Before dissipation, it made a sharp turn to the north-northeast. It had dissipated on October 31.

Tropical Storm Sharon 

Tropical Storm Sharon was a late season tropical storm that formed a few hundred miles from Mexico on November 25. It slowly strengthened into a minimal tropical storm before unfavorable conditions caused it to dissipate on November 29.

Storm names 
These names were used for storms that formed in 1971. It is the same list used in the 1967 season. A storm was named Sharon for the first time this year. No names were retired, so it was used again in the 1975 season.

The central Pacific used names and numbers from the west Pacific's typhoon name list. No storms formed in the region, and thus no names were used. However, tropical disturbances that later became typhoons started forming in this area.

Season effects 

This is a table of all of the storms in the 1971 Pacific hurricane season. It includes their durations, peak intensities, names, landfall(s), damages, and death totals. Deaths in parentheses are additional and indirect (an example of an indirect death would be a traffic accident), but are still storm-related. Damage and deaths include totals while the storm was extratropical or a wave or a low.

See also 

 List of Pacific hurricanes
 Pacific hurricane season
 1971 Atlantic hurricane season
 1971 Pacific typhoon season
 1971 North Indian Ocean cyclone season
 Australian cyclone seasons: 1970–71, 1971–72
 South Pacific cyclone seasons: 1970–71, 1971–72
 South-West Indian Ocean cyclone seasons: 1970–71, 1971–72

Notes

References 

 NOAA Monthly Weather Review accessed November 7, 2005
 Unisys Storm Tracks accessed November 7, 2005
 CPHC archive accessed November 17, 2005

External links 
 Eastern Pacific Hurricane Season of 1971
 CPHC Season Summary
 ATCR Eastern Pacific summary (PDF)
 Unisys Storm Tracks

 
Pacific hurricane seasons
Articles which contain graphical timelines